= Occultus =

Occultus may refer to:

- Occult, a category of esoteric or supernatural beliefs and practices
- Stian Johansen (musician) (born 1971), Norwegian musician
